Torquato Lorena Jardim (born 12 December 1949 in Rio de Janeiro) is a Brazilian jurist. He was minister of the Superior Electoral Court (TSE) from 1988 to 1996 and is currently minister of Transparency, Supervision and CGU, appointed by President Michel Temer.

On 28 May 2017, Brazilian president Michel Temer named Jardim as Minister of Justice.

References

|-

1949 births
Living people
People from Rio de Janeiro (city)
Government ministers of Brazil
Ministers of Justice of Brazil